Tokugawa may refer to:

Tokugawa era, an alternative term for the Edo period, 1603 to 1868
Tokugawa shogunate, a feudal regime of Japan during the Edo period
Tokugawa clan, a powerful family of Japan
Tokugawa Ieyasu (1543–1616), most notable member of the Tokugawa clan and founder of its shogunate
Tokugawa (surname), a Japanese surname
Tokchon, South P'yŏngan province, North Korea, a city known as Tokugawa during Japanese rule
, a character in The Idolmaster Million Live!